Rattan Singh Ajnala (born 16 January 1944) was a member of the 15th Lok Sabha of India and represented the Khadoor Sahib constituency of Punjab. He represented the Tarn Taran constituency of Punjab in the 14th Lok Sabha and is a former member of the Shiromani Akali Dal (SAD) political party.

He was also member of Punjab Legislative Assembly for four terms from Ajnala Assembly Constituency.

His son Amarpal Singh Ajnala represents Ajnala Assembly Constituency from 2012 elections in Punjab.

He was expelled from the Shiromani Akali Dal political party on 12 November 2018 and then he formed the Shiromani Akali Dal (Taksali) with Ranjit Singh Brahmpura, Sewa Singh Sekhwan, Ravinder Singh Brahmpura, and his son Amarpal Singh Ajnala. 
He and his son left Shiromani Akali Dal (Taksali) & re-joined Shiromani Akali Dal on 13 February 2020 at the SAD Rajasanshi Rally in presence of Sukhbir Singh Badal. But after a couple of days, he left and rejoined the Shiromani Akali Dal (Taksali) again because he said he still felt annoyed with Badal. However his son Amarpal Singh Ajnala still remained with the Shiromani Akali Dal.

References

External links
 Members of Fourteenth Lok Sabha - Parliament of India website

Living people
1944 births
India MPs 2004–2009
Politicians from Amritsar
Shiromani Akali Dal politicians
India MPs 2009–2014
Lok Sabha members from Punjab, India
People from Tarn Taran district
Shiromani Akali Dal (Taksali) politicians